Tomasin is a surname. Notable people with the surname include:

Glauco Tomasin (born 1939), Italian footballer and manager
Jenny Tomasin (1938–2012), English actress
Stephen Tomasin (born 1994), American rugby union player

See also
Tomasini
Tomasino